Terellia cyanoides is a species of tephritid or fruit flies in the genus Terellia of the family Tephritidae.

Distribution
Ukraine.

References

Tephritinae
Insects described in 2003
Diptera of Europe